Karmadon (Genaldon) gorge is a gorge in North Ossetia. The Genaldon river (Terek basin) of the Greater Caucasus mountain system flows in the gorge. In the upper reaches of the gorge there are two glaciers: Kolka and Mayli. It is located at altitudes from 750 m to 1200 m above sea level.

There are geothermal springs and mineral water outlets in the gorge and it serves as a place of rest for the residents of Vladikavkaz.

A popular climbing route to Mount Kazbek passes through the Karmadon gorge along the Mayli glacier.

Collapse 

On September 20, 2002, there was a rock ice slide of the Kolka glacier. A mass of snow, ice and stones moved along the gorge at a speed of over 180 km/h. As a result of the glacier's descent, the village of Verkhny Karmadon was completely destroyed, around 140 people died, including the film crew of the film "The Messenger", led by Sergei Bodrov Jr.

Gallery

External links 

 The 2002 rock/ice avalanche at Kolka/Karmadon, Russian Caucasus: assessment of extraordinary avalanche formation and mobility, and application of QuickBird satellite imagery

References 

Geography of North Ossetia–Alania